Clarissa Kaye (2 August 193121 July 1994) was an Australian stage, film and television actress. She was the second wife (1971–1984) of the British actor James Mason. After her marriage, she was often known as Clarissa Kaye-Mason.

Biography
Clarissa Kaye was born as Clarissa Knipe in Sydney in 1931. In 1958 she became one of a class of informal students of Hayes Gordon, who taught "The Method" (the group included Reg Livermore and Jon Ewing). Their first public performances were a series of one-act plays by Tennessee Williams. The group later became the Ensemble Theatre, Sydney's first theatre in the round and its longest established professional theatre company.

Her first film role was as Meg in Age of Consent (1969), in which she appeared in scenes with James Mason, including a sex scene that was censored from Columbia Pictures' UK and U.S. releases.

Kaye was attracted to Mason and later tracked him down. She wrote to Mason reminding him of their meeting and their sex scene in Age of Consent, and he wrote back. A correspondence between the two followed, and Kaye fuelled the relationship by travelling long distance to meet him.

Marriage
Mason and Kaye were married on 8 August 1971 in Corseaux-sur-Vevey, Switzerland, and remained together until his death in 1984. (It has been reported that it was her second marriage.) Kaye reportedly was willing to put her career on hold, but Mason regularly insisted that she be given roles in his films. They shared scenes in Frankenstein: The True Story (1973); they also both appeared in Salem's Lot (1979), but did not share any scenes.

They appeared on Broadway in April 1979 in Brian Friel's play Faith Healer, but were never on stage together (the play is constructed as four monologues by three characters). Her involvement in Faith Healer was also largely at Mason's request, but she struggled with both the role and José Quintero's direction. Ed Flanders eventually left the play, refusing to work with Kaye, and the production ended after only 17 days.

Death
James Mason died in 1984. Clarissa Kaye died a decade later, aged 62, on 21 July 1994 from cancer. Before Mason remarried, his children Portland and Morgan (both from his first marriage to Pamela Mason) were to be the beneficiaries of his large estate, valued at £15 million. Mason changed his will to leave Clarissa Kaye as the sole beneficiary, but the children understood from a letter that Mason wrote to them that they would still ultimately receive the proceeds after their stepmother's death. However, she was on such bad terms with them to the point of pathological jealousy that she cut them out of all photos with Mason.

Disregarding Mason's letter saying the children would get his money after Kaye's death, Kaye left Mason's entire estate to an unidentified trust rumoured to be on behalf of the Sathya Sai Organization, run by devotees of the Indian guru Sathya Sai Baba. The organization, based in an ashram near Bangalore, neither confirmed nor denied this.

Mason's ashes were also the subject of controversy. Kaye initially had them in an urn in her home, never telling Mason's children she had them. She later deposited them in a Geneva bank vault, again to hide them. They tracked them down after Kaye's death, and took legal action to retrieve and inter them, and through court order by the judge who declared that his children deserved the right to choose the wording on their father's gravestone.

Partial filmography
 Age of Consent (1969) - Meg
 Adam's Woman (1970) - Matron
 Ned Kelly (1970) - Ellen Kelly
 The Yin and the Yang of Mr. Go (1970) - Zelda
 The MacKintosh Man (1973) - Guest at Reception (uncredited)
 Frankenstein: The True Story (TV; 1973) - Lady Fanshawe
 Salem's Lot (TV; 1979) - Marjorie Glick
 Dr. Fischer of Geneva aka The Bomb Party (TV; 1985) - Mrs. Montgomery
 The Umbrella Woman aka The Good Wife (1987) - Mrs. Jackson
 The First Kangaroos (1988) - Mrs Messenger
 The Last Resort (Australian TV series; 1988)
 Bangkok Hilton (TV mini-series; 1989) - Mrs. Cameron (final television appearance)

References

External links
 

1994 deaths
1931 births
Deaths from cancer in Australia
Australian stage actresses
Australian film actresses
Australian television actresses
Actresses from Sydney
James Mason family